Zefiro may refer to:

Zefiro (rocket stage), a solid-fuel motor for the European Space Agency Vega rocket
Bombardier Zefiro, a high speed train
Carlos Zéfiro (1921–1992), Brazilian pornographic comic artist
A fictional Romani tribe in Marvel Comics' Doctor Doom comic books; see Doom 2099
Zefiro (restaurant), a restaurant in Portland, Oregon, United States